Below are the squads for the 2014 Toulon Tournament. Each team had to submit a maximum of 22 players.

Players in boldface have been capped at full international level at some point in their career.

Group A

France
Coach:  Ludovic Batelli

Mexico 
Coach:  Raúl Gutiérrez

China
Coach:   Fu Bo

Chile
Coach: Claudio Vivas

Portugal
Coach:  Ilídio Vale

Group B

Brazil
Coach: Alexandre Gallo

England
Coach:  Gareth Southgate

Colombia 
Coach:  Carlos Alberto Restrepo Isaza

Qatar
Coach:  Félix Sánchez Bas

South Korea
Coach: Lee Kwang-Jong

References

Footnotes

Toulon Tournament squads
Squad